Per-Axel Helge Branner (né Larsson; 25 January 1899 – 31 July 1975) was a Swedish actor, screenwriter and film director.

Selected filmography 
 Getting Married (1926)
 His Life's Match (1932)
 Pettersson & Bendel (1933)
 Man's Way with Women (1934)
 Adventure (1936)
 Conflict (1937)
 A Cruise in the Albertina (1938)
 She Thought It Was Him (1943)

References

Bibliography 
 Qvist, Per Olov & von Bagh, Peter. Guide to the Cinema of Sweden and Finland. Greenwood Publishing Group, 2000.

External links 
 

1899 births
1975 deaths
People from Linköping
Swedish film directors
Swedish male stage actors
20th-century Swedish screenwriters
20th-century Swedish male writers